Mister International is an annual international male beauty pageant that the Mister International Organization runs since 2006. Along with its rival contest, Mister World, this pageant is one of the two largest male beauty pageants in the world in terms of the number of national-level competitions. 

The current Mister International is Enmanuel “Manu” Franco of Dominican Republic who was crowned on October 30, 2022, in Manila, Philippines.

History 
Mister International Organization was Singapore-based owned and organized by the former president and founder, Alan Sim, Since the first edition, 80 countries have sent their representative to this pageant, with an annual average of 38 contestants. Mister International Organization licenses local organizations that wish to select the Mister International contestant for their country, and approves the selection method for national contestants. Traditionally, Mister International lived in Singapore during his reign and was allowed to live anywhere in every country (hence the name Mister International).  

Since Sim's death in October 2022, the organization relocated its headquarters to Thailand and Pradit Pradinunt being the new president from October 2022.

Titleholders

Country by number of wins

Other Mr. International
Mr. International a male pageant, organized by Graviera, a men's clothing company in India began in 1998 and was held annually in India until 2003, when it was staged in London. It has not been held since then and has been de facto replaced by Mister International and the more popular Mister World.

Entries have been cross-referenced with their participation in Manhunt, Mr Intercontinental and Mister World pageants.

Titleholders

Note: In 2003 edition, three contestants came from United Arab Emirates, included  Abu Dhabi, Dubai and Sharjah. William Kelly represented Sharjah and later won the title.'

League tables

Country by number of wins

 Continents by number of wins 

Mister International countries by wins.

Note: Winner of 2003 Edition, William Kelly, represents Sharjah one of the emirates of UAE. The crown will count for United Arab Emirates only and not for Sharjah for it is not a country. The table shows that the crown won by William Kelly of Sharjah will count for UAE.''

See also
 Manhunt International
 Mister Global
 Mister World
 Mister Supranational
 Man of the World

Notes

References

External links
 
Official Instagram 

Mister International
International beauty pageants
Male beauty pageants
2006 establishments in Singapore
Recurring events established in 2006